Crucifixion in the Philippines is a devotional practice held every Good Friday, and is part of the local observance of Holy Week. Devotees or penitents called magdarame in Kapampangan are willingly crucified in imitation of Jesus Christ's suffering and death, while related practices include carrying wooden crosses, crawling on rough pavement, and self-flagellation. Penitents consider these acts to be mortification of the flesh, and undertake these to ask forgiveness for sins, to fulfil a panatà (Filipino, "vow"), or to express gratitude for favours granted. In the most famous case, Ruben Enaje drives four-inch nails into both hands and feet and then he is lifted on a wooden cross for around five minutes.

San Pedro Cutud, San Fernando 

The San Pedro Cutud Lenten Rites are a re-enactment of Christ’s Passion and crucifixion held in Barangay San Pedro Cutud, San Fernando, Pampanga. It includes a passion play, culminating in the actual nailing of at least three penitents to wooden crosses atop a makeshift Calvary.

Ruben Enaje has been crucified 33 times as of 2019. He began his yearly rite after surviving a fall from a three-story billboard in 1986. Other penitents crucified with Enaje on Good Friday 2013 were Angelito Mengillo; Arnold Meniego; Byron Gómez; Willy Salvador; Angelito Manansala; Jonny Manansala; Marben Unquico; Arnel Sanggalang; Victor Caparas; Rolando Ocampo; Orlando Valentin; Arnel Reyes; Rolando Baking; and four others.
Ramíl Lázaro – a dishwasher, wheeler, and pedicab driver, also got his share of stainless steel nails along with five penitents on Good Friday at San Pedro Cutud, on Good Friday, April 6, 2012. He is expected to take the role of Christ, replacing Enaje

Alex Laranang – 59, who claims to have been crucified every year since 2000.
Arturo Bating – 44 (last 2012) had four-inch nails driven through his palms for the first time in Good Friday of 2012.

Paombong, Bulacan 
Crucifixions are also held in Barangay Kapitangan, Paombong, Bulacan which is a locally-known pilgrimage area and haven for faith healers Many women have been nailed to the cross, acting on directions "from above", claiming mediumship of Christ either as the Santo Niño or the Black Nazarene.

Percy Valencia – 41, one of a handful of women who are also crucified annually. Nailed to the cross on 6 April 2012.
Rady Gonzáles – of Barangay Sto. Rosario, stayed nailed on the wooden cross for about 10 minutes as the crowd sang the Lord's Prayer.
Buboy Dionisio – also of Barangay Sto. Rosario, nailed for the ninth consecutive year in 2012. He claims receiving a vision of the Virgin Mary giving him three nails the first time he underwent crucifixion. He said that every year, he saw different visions which came before Holy Week.
JonJon Tanael – of Barangay Bulihan, Malolos City, on 6 April 2012.
Rolando Ocampo - 56, has been crucified every year since 1990 as a sign of his gratitude to God. He says God miraculously saved his wife from a difficult childbirth in that year. Ocampo prepares for his crucifixion for days in advance. He spends time alone and engages in deep meditation before the day on which he will share in Christ's suffering.
John Safran (pseudonym John Michael) - a 37-year-old Australian media personality and author from Melbourne who wore a long wig and a tin crown of thorns on 10 April 2009.
 A 15-year-old boy and 18-year-old girl in 2008.

Duljo-Fatima, Cebu City 
 Gilbert Bargayo – crucified for the 15th time in Carcar, Cebu, and for the 17th time in Barangay Duljo-Fatima, Cebu City in 2012. Six-inch nails pierced his palms and feet, and took 45 minutes to all be hammered in.

Angeles 
The Siete Palabras (Seven Last Words) play in Angeles, Pampanga, depicts the sufferings of Christ from his sentencing by Pontius Pilate to his death. This takes the form of a colourful street play, with dozens of men carrying wooden crosses as heavy as 50 kg (110 pounds) and scores flagellating themselves in Barangay Lourdes Northwest, Angeles, between 14:00 and 15:00 PST (GMT+8).

Gallery

References 

 The Crucifixion of Jesus, Completely Revised and Expanded: A Forensic Inquiry by Frederick T. Zugibe / Hardcover: 352 pages, Publisher: M. Evans & Company; 2nd Edition (April 1, 2005) 

Crucifixion
Holy Week in the Philippines
Catholic adoration of Jesus